Oreopanax corazonensis is a species of plant in the family Araliaceae. It is endemic to Ecuador.  Its natural habitat is subtropical or tropical moist montane forests. It is threatened by habitat loss.

References

Endemic flora of Ecuador
corazonensis
Endangered plants
Taxonomy articles created by Polbot